Beiwa is a township of Lingshou County, Hebei province, China, located  north of the county seat and just east of G5 Beijing–Kunming Expressway. , it had 9 villages under its administration.

See also
List of township-level divisions of Hebei

References

Township-level divisions of Hebei